The Shire of Maldon was a local government area about  northwest of Melbourne, the state capital of Victoria, Australia, and  southwest of the regional city of Bendigo.

History

Maldon was first incorporated as a municipality on 6 August 1858, then as a road district on 2 September 1863. It was proclaimed a shire on 12 January 1864.

On 20 January 1995, the Shire of Maldon was abolished, and along with the City of Castlemaine and the Shires of Metcalfe and Newstead, was merged into the newly created Shire of Mount Alexander.

Wards

The Shire of Maldon was divided into three ridings on 1 April 1988, each of which elected three councillors:
 Gowar Riding
 Nuggetty Riding
 Tarrengower Riding

Towns and localities
 Baringhup
 Cairn Curran
 Gowar
 Maldon*
 Muckleford
 Neereman
 Nuggetty
 Porcupine Flat
 Tarrengower
 Walmer
 Woodbrook

* Council seat.

Population

* Estimate in the 1958 Victorian Year Book.

References

External links
 Victorian Places - Maldon and Maldon Shire

Maldon